Edigleuson Alves de Sousa (born 26 June 1984), known as just Alves, is a Brazilian born, Azerbaijani futsal player who plays for Araz Naxçivan and the Azerbaijan national futsal team.

References

External links
UEFA profile

1984 births
Living people
Azerbaijani men's futsal players
Brazilian men's futsal players
Araz Naxçivan players
Brazilian emigrants to Azerbaijan
Luparense Calcio a 5 players